Peter L. Cunningham (August 14, 1814 – April 22, 1899) was a one-term mayor of South Norwalk, Connecticut in 1883.

He was born in New York City on August 14, 1814. He came to Old Well (now South Norwalk), Connecticut in the spring of 1834.

In 1840, he organized the First Rifle Company (known as the Mohican Rifle Corps) of the Ninth Regiment, Fourth Brigade, C.S.S. He was its commander for several years.

In 1858, he was appointed colonel on the staff of Governor William A.Buckingham.

In 1861, he was appointed Lieutenant Colonel of the Eighth Connecticut Volunteers, but resigned the commission after four months with an honorable discharge. In that same year, he was
elected to the Connecticut House of Representatives from Norwalk. He was a member of the Military Committee of the Legislature of Connecticut. In that committee, he proposed that $3 million should be appropriated for the defense of the Union. That proposal was passed by both chambers of the legislature. Another $3 million would subsequently be approved.

From 1877 to 1879, Cunningham served on the South Norwalk City Council as its senior member. He served as mayor from 1883 to 1884.

He served as a director on the boards of the Central Nation Bank, the First National Bank, and the Norwalk Gas Company.

Associations 
 Member (May 11, 1843), Noble Grand (January 1843); Independent Order of Odd Fellows, Our Brothers Lodge, No. 10
 Charter Member (September 17, 1845), Kalosa Encampment
 Grand Patriarch of the State of Connecticut (1853, 1854)
 Grand Representative to the Grand Lodge of the United States, held at Baltimore, Md. (1854 and 1855)
 Grand Master of the State of Connecticut (1869, 1870)
 Grand Representative to the United States Grand Lodge held at Chicago and Baltimore (1870, 1871)
 Member, St. John’s Lodge, No. 6 of Free and Accepted Masons, Norwalk. (April 29, 1847)
 Member, Clinton Commandery, Norwalk (February 11, 1853)
 Royal Arch Mason
 Knights Templar

Death 
On April 22, 1899, Cunningham died suddenly while vising the Norwalk Hospital to view the building under construction. He fell while walking down a decline at the back of the building, and died shortly thereafter. The cause of death was believed to be apoplexy.

References 

1814 births
1899 deaths
American Freemasons
American people of Scottish descent
Connecticut city council members
Mayors of Norwalk, Connecticut
Republican Party members of the Connecticut House of Representatives
Politicians from New York City
People of Connecticut in the American Civil War
Military personnel from Connecticut
19th-century American politicians